Art Electric is the third full-length album by Canadian rock band The Hunters. The album will be released on May 13, 2014 on Stomp Records, Black Numbers, Flix Records.

The foursome reached out to its fans in 2013 to help them fund their album using crowdfunding platform Indiegogo.

The album was recorded by Matt Allison at Atlas Studios in Chicago.

Track listing

Personnel
The Hunters
 Dominic Pelletier – lead vocals, guitar
 Danahé Rousseau-Côté – guitar
 Raphaël Potvin – bass guitar, vocals
 William Duguay-Drouin – drums, percussion

References

2014 albums
The Hunters (band) albums